The two-coloured caecilian (Epicrionops bicolor) is a species of caecilian in the family Rhinatrematidae found in Colombia, Ecuador, and Peru. Its natural habitats are subtropical or tropical moist montane forests, rivers, and intermittent rivers.

References

Epicrionops
Amphibians of Colombia
Amphibians of Ecuador
Amphibians of Peru
Amphibians described in 1883
Taxonomy articles created by Polbot